Susan Tedeschi (born November 9, 1970) is an American singer and guitarist. A multiple Grammy Award nominee, she is a member of the Tedeschi Trucks Band, a conglomeration of her band, her husband Derek Trucks’ band, and other musicians.

Early life
Tedeschi was born on November 9, 1970, in Boston, Massachusetts, to a family of Italian ancestry and was raised in Norwell, Massachusetts. She is the daughter of Dick Tedeschi, granddaughter of Nick Tedeschi, and great-granddaughter of Angelo Tedeschi, who founded Tedeschi Food Shops, a New England-based supermarket and convenience store chain. Tedeschi made her public debut as a five-year-old understudy in a Broadway musical. As a youth she sang for family members and listened to her father's record collection of old vinyl recordings of musicians such as Mississippi John Hurt and Lightnin' Hopkins. Raised as a Catholic, she found little inspiration in the church choir and attended predominantly African-American Baptist churches, feeling that the music was "less repressed and more like a celebration of God." In bands since the age of 13, she formed her first all-original group at 18, the Smokin' Section, in the nearby town of Scituate.

After graduating Norwell High School, Tedeschi attended the Berklee College of Music, where she sang in a gospel choir. She performed show tunes on the Spirit of Boston and received her Bachelor of Music degree in musical composition and performance at age 20. During that time, she began sitting in on blues jams at local venues and immersed herself in the Boston music scene.

Career

Early career

Tedeschi learned how to play blues guitar in Boston from musician Tim Gearan. She formed the Susan Tedeschi Band in 1993, with Adrienne Hayes, Jim Lamond and Mike Aiello. In December 1995, the band released Better Days to regional audiences. The 1997 recording sessions produced by Tom Hambridge were acquired by Richard Rosenblatt for his indie label Tone-Cool Records. The result is the first album released in February 1998 under the sole name of Susan Tedeschi; Just Won't Burn, featuring young guitarist Sean Costello, received very positive reviews, particularly from critics and blues publications.

Tedeschi was the first artist to play Michele Clark's first Sunset Sessions in March 1998 at the Marriott Hotels & Resorts in the United States Virgin Islands.

In 1999, Tedeschi played several dates in the all-woman traveling festival Lilith Fair organized by Sarah McLachlan. Throughout 1998 and 1999, she extensively toured the United States and drew larger crowds.

As an opening act
Eventually, Tedeschi was opening for John Mellencamp, B.B. King, Buddy Guy, The Allman Brothers Band, Taj Mahal and Bob Dylan. In 2000, Just Won't Burn (1998) reached Gold record status for sales of 500,000 in the United States, rare for a blues production. She recorded two tracks with Double Trouble band members Chris Layton and Tommy Shannon for their album.

She opened for The Rolling Stones in 2003 and played in huge venues, gaining national exposure. The gig was not financially lucrative. According to Tedeschi, "They pay, but it's not great. I don't make any money 'cause I've got to pay all my sidemen. I'll be lucky if I break even."

In 2004, Tedeschi was featured on the PBS television program Austin City Limits with William Green on Hammond organ; Jason Crosby on keyboards, violin, and vocals; Ron Perry on bass; and Jeff Sipe on drums.

Soul Stew Revival

While in New Orleans opening for the Allman Brothers Band on their 1999 summer tour, Tedeschi met Derek Trucks, the band's slide guitarist and bandleader and lead guitarist of The Derek Trucks Band. In addition to a personal relationship, Tedeschi and Trucks then toured together frequently under the name Soul Stew Revival. This included members of The Derek Trucks Band, members of Tedeschi's band, and other musicians who travelled with them, including Trucks' younger brother, drummer Duane Trucks. In 2008, they added a three-piece horn section.

Tedeschi Trucks Band
In 2010, Tedeschi and Trucks announced a hiatus for their solo bands, and formed a new group called Tedeschi Trucks Band. The group performed at a number of festivals including Eric Clapton's Crossroads Guitar Festival, Fuji Rock Festival and others. Unlike their previous collaborative project – Derek Trucks & Susan Tedeschi's Soul Stew Revival – the Tedeschi Trucks Band focuses on writing and performing original material and is the focus of both Trucks and Tedeschi for the foreseeable future.

Layla Revisited (Live at LOCKN') was announced on May 7, 2021. The album is a one-time live recording of the Derek and The Dominos album Layla and Other Assorted Love Songs performed in full with Trey Anastasio. Recorded on August 24, 2019 at the Lockn' Festival in Arrington, Virginia, the album was released on July 16, 2021.

Personal life
On December 5, 2001, Tedeschi married Derek Trucks.  They have two children: Charles Kahlil Trucks, born in March 2002, is named for saxophonist Charlie Parker, guitarist Charlie Christian, and author Kahlil Gibran. Sophia Naima Trucks, born in 2004, takes her middle name from the ballad composed by John Coltrane, in honor of his first wife.  They reside in Jacksonville, Florida.

Tedeschi arranged the Berklee scholarship that was awarded to Adrianne Lenker, lead singer, guitarist and songwriter of the Grammy-nominated rock band Big Thief.

Influences
Tedeschi's voice has been described as a blend of Bonnie Raitt and Janis Joplin, both of whom she claims as influences. Her guitar playing is influenced by Buddy Guy, Johnny "Guitar" Watson, Stevie Ray Vaughan, Freddie King and Doyle Bramhall II. On the album Just Won't Burn (1998), she lists a multitude of inspirations from various genres.  This list includes Irma Thomas, Etta James, Bob Marley, Toots Hibbert, Aretha Franklin, Otis Rush, Ronnie Earl, Otis Clay, Ray Charles, Billie Holiday, Bob Dylan, Dennis Montgomery III, Orville Wright, Walter Beasley, Kenya Hathaway, and Mahalia Jackson.

Award nominations
 2000 Grammy nomination for Best New Artist
 2003 Grammy nomination for Best Female Rock Vocal Performance
 2004 Grammy nomination for Best Contemporary Blues Album for Wait For Me
 2006 Grammy nomination for Best Contemporary Blues Album for Hope and Desire
 2010 Grammy nomination for Best Contemporary Blues Album for Back to the River
 2016 Americana Music Award for Duo/Group of the Year (with Tedeschi Trucks Band)
 2017 Grammy nomination for Best Contemporary Blues Album for Live from the Fox Oakland

Awards won
 2012 Grammy Award for Best Blues Album for Revelator (with Tedeschi Trucks Band)
 2014 Blues Music Award for Contemporary Female Blues Artist of the Year
 2014 Blues Music Award for Band of the Year (with Tedeschi Trucks Band)
 2014 Blues Music Award for Rock Blues Album of the Year for "Made Up Mind" (with Tedeschi Trucks Band)
 2017 Blues Music Award for Rock Blues Album of the Year for "Let Me Get By" (with Tedeschi Trucks Band)
 2017 Blues Music Award for Band of the Year (with Tedeschi Trucks Band)
 2017 Blues Music Award for Contemporary Female Blues Artist of the Year

Tedeschi served as a judge for the 7th annual Independent Music Awards.

Discography

As leader or co-leader
 Better Days (Oarfin, 1995)
 Just Won't Burn (Tone Cool, 1998)
 Wait for Me (Tone Cool, 2002)
 Live from Austin, TX (New West, 2004)
 Hope and Desire (Verve Forecast, 2005)
 Back to the River (Verve Forecast, 2008)

With the Tedeschi Trucks Band 
 Revelator (Masterworks, 2011)
 Everybody's Talkin' (Masterworks, 2012)
 Made Up Mind (Masterworks, 2013)
 Let Me Get By (Fantasy, 2016)
 Live from the Fox Oakland (Fantasy, 2017)
 Signs (Fantasy, 2019)
 Layla Revisited (Live at LOCKN') (Fantasy, 2021)
 I Am the Moon (Fantasy, 2022)

As guest
 Welcome to Little Milton (1999), Little Milton
 Joyful Noise (2002), Derek Trucks Band
 Already Free (2009), Derek Trucks Band
 Truth  (2007), Robben Ford
 Bug, Various (Lionsgate, 2007)
 Skin Deep (2008), Buddy Guy
 "Space Captain", The Imagine Project (2010), Herbie Hancock with Derek Trucks
 "Burn it down", Tin Can Trust (2010), Los Lobos
 "Bright Lights, Big City" Roots (2011) Johnny Winter
 "Mixed Drinks About Feelings", Mr. Misunderstood (2015), Eric Church
 "Ain't No Thing", Wynonna & the Big Noise (2016), Wynonna Judd
 "Color of the Blues", For Better, or Worse (2016), John Prine
 Song of Lahore, The Sachal Ensemble with Derek Trucks (Universal, 2016) 
 "Cortez The Killer", 2019, Dave Matthews Band

References

External links 

 Susan Tedeschi official site
 Derek and Susan.net/ Official site for both Derek Trucks and Susan Tedeschi
 DerekTrucksBand.com – official site
  Interview with Tedeschi in Performing Musician magazine

1970 births
American people of Italian descent
American blues guitarists
American blues singer-songwriters
American blues singers
Berklee College of Music alumni
Blues rock musicians
Contemporary blues musicians
Grammy Award winners
Living people
Mercury Records artists
People from Norwell, Massachusetts
Rounder Records artists
Singer-songwriters from Massachusetts
Verve Forecast Records artists
Guitarists from Massachusetts
The Other Ones members
Tedeschi Trucks Band members
21st-century American women singers
21st-century American women guitarists
21st-century American guitarists
Trucks family
21st-century American singers